The 1959 Volta a Catalunya was the 39th edition of the Volta a Catalunya cycle race and was held from 6 September to 13 September 1959. The race started in Montjuïc and finished in Barcelona. The race was won by Salvador Botella.

General classification

References

1959
Volta
1959 in Spanish road cycling
September 1959 sports events in Europe